State Route 90 (SR 90) is a state highway in the U.S. state of California that consists of two unconnected pieces in Greater Los Angeles.

Most of the western portion of SR 90 is the Marina Freeway, a short freeway in southwestern Los Angeles and the nearby suburbs, linking Marina del Rey to the rest of Greater Los Angeles. SR 90 begins at Lincoln Boulevard (State Route 1) near Marina del Rey as the Marina Expressway. It then goes past a few intersections before becoming the Marina Freeway. It then continues eastward approximately along the border between the Del Rey and Westchester neighborhoods of the city of Los Angeles before terminating in Slauson Avenue in southern Culver City to just past Culver Boulevard.

The eastern portion of SR 90 runs along Imperial Highway between Beach Boulevard (State Route 39) in La Habra and  State Route 91 in Anaheim Hills, also passing through Brea and Yorba Linda. A stretch in Yorba Linda between Yorba Linda Boulevard and Orangethorpe Avenue was relinquished to the city in 2002 and built to freeway standards. The city renamed it the Richard M. Nixon Freeway in honor of the 37th President of the United States, Richard Nixon, who was born in Yorba Linda less than half a mile away from the road.

Route description
The west segment of SR 90 begins at Lincoln Boulevard (State Route 1) in the Del Rey district of Los Angeles. It heads east along the Marina Expressway, past several intersections, and becomes the Marina Freeway after crossing Ballona Creek. After two interchanges - with Centinela Avenue and Interstate 405 - SR 90 and the freeway end at Slauson Avenue.

The east segment begins at the intersection of Imperial Highway and Beach Boulevard (State Route 39) in La Habra. It heads east and southeast on Imperial Highway, ending at State Route 91 about  after crossing the Santa Ana River from Yorba Linda into Anaheim. A portion of the road in Yorba Linda is built to freeway standards; it is now known as the Richard M. Nixon Parkway after the city accepted maintenance in 2002. However, the same state law that authorized relinquishment required the city to "maintain signs directing motorists to the continuation of Route 90".

SR 90 is part of the California Freeway and Expressway System, and is part of the National Highway System, a network of highways that are considered essential to the country's economy, defense, and mobility by the Federal Highway Administration.

History
Legislative Route 221 (the Slauson Freeway, now the Marina Freeway) was defined in 1947 to run from pre-1964 Legislative Route 60 (now State Route 1) east to pre-1964 Legislative Route 165 (now Interstate 110). A 1959 extension took it east to pre-1964 Legislative Route 170 (now Interstate 605).

To the east, Legislative Route 176 (the Yorba Linda Freeway, now also the Marina Freeway) was defined in 1939 from pre-1964 Legislative Route 62 (now State Route 39) east and southeast to pre-1964 Legislative Route 43 (now State Route 91). A 1959 extension took it west to pre-1964 Legislative Route 174 (later State Route 42) near Norwalk.

In the 1964 renumbering, LR 221 was assigned State Route 90, but LR 176 all became part of State Route 42, along with the connecting LR 174 to the west. The piece of LR 176 between I-605 and SR 39 was reassigned to SR 90 in 1965, and the rest east to SR 91 became part of SR 90 in 1968 (at the same time as SR 42 became Interstate 105).

Originally planned as the Slauson Freeway, Route 90 was slated to extend across southern Los Angeles County and northern Orange County, ending at the Riverside Freeway in eastern Anaheim.  However, by the 1960s, community opposition had reduced it to what is effectively a minor spur of I-405 to Marina Del Rey (derisively dubbed the "Slauson Cutoff" by comedian Johnny Carson).  It was renamed the Richard M. Nixon Freeway for a brief period in the early 1970s, but after Nixon's resignation in the wake of the Watergate scandal, its name was changed to the current appellation.

From I-405 west to Centinela Avenue, the Marina Freeway is 8 lanes wide, before it quickly narrows to 4 lanes at the Culver Boulevard exit. There has been talk of extending the Marina Expressway slightly west of Lincoln Boulevard (Route 1) to Admiralty Way (approximately ) to accommodate ongoing expansion of the Marina Del Rey area. Strong opposition to this makes actualization of this plan uncertain. The proposed design alternatives for the expansion would require the acquisition of surrounding properties and potentially infringe of parts of a public park along Admiralty, which contains a section of the Marvin Braude Bike Trail.

There were once plans to connect the two sections via the Slauson Freeway and Yorba Linda Freeway, mostly parallel to Slauson Avenue, but this was never built. The full route was added to the California Freeway and Expressway System in 1959.

In 2002 the City of Yorba Linda assumed responsibility for Imperial Highway to complete various construction projects within city limits when the State Assembly passed AB 887; it lost its state route designation in the process and is now called the Richard M. Nixon Parkway within the city.

The freeway extension was completed in early 2007. The freeway extension also allows Route 90 drivers to avoid a traffic signal at Alla Road (just west of Culver Boulevard.). After the end of the freeway, a pair of frontage roads operating as an expressway continues as Route 90 up to Route 1 (Lincoln Boulevard). Signalized intersections occur at Mindanao Way and Lincoln Boulevard, which is the end of the expressway in Marina del Rey. The reason for the extension is to relieve traffic congestion on surface streets.

Major intersections

See also

References

External links

California @ AARoads.com - State Route 90
Caltrans: Route 90 highway conditions
California Highways: SR 90
California Consumers Against the State Route SR 90 Extension

090
090
State Route 090
State Route 090